Moross may refer to:
 Aries Moross, London-based designer and illustrator
 Ernest Moross, motorsport press agent
 Jerome Moross, American-born composer
 Kelly Moross Craft, United States Ambassador to the United Nations and United States Ambassador to Canada
 Moross House, oldest surviving brick house in Detroit, Michigan